El Imposible National Park (Spanish: Parque Nacional El Imposible) is a tropical forest and a national park in El Salvador. It was established on 1 January 1989 and covers an area of 38.20 square kilometres. It literally means "The Impossible National Park" in English. It has an altitude of between 250 and 1,425 metres. El Imposible was named for the perilous gorge which used to claim the lives of farmers and pack mules transporting coffee to the Pacific port. El Imposible sits in the Apaneca Ilamatepec Mountain Range between 300m and 1450m above sea level, and includes eight rivers which feed the watershed for Barra de Santiago and the mangrove forests along the coast.

The park is still home to an extraordinary variety of plant and animal life, including pumas, oncilla, wild boars, king hawks and black-crested eagles. The Pacific Ocean is visible from high points in the forest.

In 1992 El Imposible was entered on the UNESCO World Heritage Tentative Lists, together with the Cara Sucia.

References

External links
Imposible tours
Parque Nacional El Imposible

National parks of El Salvador
Protected areas established in 1989
Central American dry forests